Mapo Central School was a junior high school in Ibadan, Nigeria established by the Anglican Church Mission Society in the 1930s.

Notable alumni
Samuel Odulana Odungade I, Nigerian monarch
Michael Adigun, Nigerian minister of agriculture
Akin Mabogunje, Nigerian geographer

External links

Schools in Ibadan
Educational institutions established in the 1930s
1930s establishments in Nigeria